Eudorylini is a tribe of big-headed flies (insects in the family Pipunculidae).

Genera
 Genus Allomethus Hardy, 1943
 Genus Amazunculus Rafael, 1986
 Genus Basileunculus Rafael, 1987
 Genus Claraeola Aczél, 1940
 Genus Clistoabdominalis Skevington, 2001
 Genus Dasydorylas Skevington, 2001
 Genus Elmohardyia Rafael, 1987
 Genus Eudorylas Aczél, 1940

References

Pipunculidae
Brachycera tribes